This riot should not be confused with the 1852 Whaler Riot in Honolulu.
The Honolulu Courthouse riot, or the Election riot, occurred in February 1874 when Hawaiian followers of Queen Emma, known as Emmaites, attacked supporters of King Kalakaua on the latter's election day and started a riot. Marines and sailors from three American and British warships were landed and they successfully quelled the rioters and Kalakaua took the oath of office the following day without further opposition.

Royal Elections of 1874
The Royal Elections of 1874 were held in Hawaii February 12, 1874. It was the second time an election for head of state was held. According to the Constitution of 1864, article 22 stated if the monarch dies before naming a successor "such vacancy, shall cause a meeting of the Legislative Assembly, who shall elect by ballot some native Ali'i of the Kingdom as Successor," therefore the elections were held by the representatives not the public.  Only three candidates were considered seriously.

Candidates
National
David Kalākaua

Queen's
Emma Rooke

Independent
Bernice Bishop

Riot

After the death of King Lunalilo on February 3, 1874, an electoral process began with Queen Emma, the widow of King Kamehameha IV, running against David Kalakaua. Emma was a popular choice among the people, especially in Honolulu, but her pro-British views were unpopular with the Hawaiian legislature dominated by pro-American factions, compared to Kalakaua, who was considered more sympathetic to growing power of the American business interest in the islands, so when election day came on February 12, she lost by a vote of thirty-nine to six, in the legislature. Her supporters were unhappy with the decision. The election proceedings were held at the Honolulu Courthouse, which is where an angry mob of about 100 of the queen's followers gathered. Since the Hawaiian army had been disbanded after a mutiny sometime before, and the militias were unreliable, there was nobody to stop the riot. The Honolulu police force deserted and also joined in the unrest, even fighting against each other depending on their political sympathies. The queen's followers first surrounded and besieged the courthouse at around 3:00 am, then went for the occupants of other buildings which spread the riot throughout most of the city. A carriage was waiting outside of the courthouse to deliver news of the verdict to Kalakaua, who was waiting at his home, but before the electoral committee could tell the driver, the mob tore it apart. Kalakaua's followers put up little to no resistance and the decision was made to consult with the American Minister Henry A. Peirce who requested aid from the United States Navy and Royal Navy commanders at the island. The two American sloops-of-war, USS Tuscarora and USS Portsmouth were anchored in Honolulu Harbor, on an expedition of negotiation to allow the exportation of sugar to America duty-free, but instead their commanders agreed to intervene in a major civil disturbance.

A force of 150 American marines and sailors under Lieutenant Commander Theodore F. Jewell were put ashore along with another seventy to eighty Britons under Captain Edward Hood Lingard Ray from the sloop HMS Tenedos. The Americans headed straight for the courthouse, pushing back the rioters, and placing guards, they also occupied the city armory, the treasury, the station house, and the jail, filled with riled up prisoners who Queen Emma said she would free. British forces attacked up the Nuuanu Valley to Emma's house where they dispersed a large crowd with force. They then went back to Honolulu to man the palace and the barracks. By sundown, some rioters had been captured and the city was mostly quiet with the exception of sporadic musketry and the sounds of breaking glass. Several people were killed or injured in the conflict, including many foreign citizens though no American naval personnel were hurt seriously and it is not believed any of the Britons were either. Emma claimed no part in riot, but the opinion was that she supported the actions of her followers. The riot gained nothing for the queen and Kalakaua took the oath on February 13, after which his right to the throne was no longer in threat. The marines and sailors ended their occupation on February 20. America's involvement in the riot also led to the establishment of the first United States Navy coaling and repair station in Pearl Harbor.

Casualties

Many were injured during the riot. Thirteen legislators who voted for Kalākaua were severely injured including Samuel Kipi, J. W. Lonoaea, Thomas N. Birch, David Hopeni Nahinu, P. Haupu, C. K. Kakani, S. K. Kupihea, William Luther Moehonua, C. K. Kapule, D. Kaukaha, Pius F. Koakanu, D. W. Kaiue and R. P. Kuikahi. Based on photographic evidence (right), it appears that William Thomas Martin may also have been injured. Two individuals not affiliated with the legislature were also injured: British subject John Foley, who tried to rescue Moehonua from the rioters, and a native partisan of Kalākaua's John Koii Unauna. No foreigners except Foley were harmed. Representative Lonoaea, the only fatality of the event, died as result of his injuries.

See also
Pacific Squadron
Battle of Nuuanu
Kepelino

References

Honolulu
United States Navy in the 19th century
History of the Royal Navy
Naval operations and battles
Riots and civil disorder in Hawaii
1874 riots
1874 in Hawaii
Military expeditions of the United States
Punitive expeditions of the United Kingdom
February 1874 events
Military of the Hawaiian Kingdom